is the present official kanazukai (system of spelling the Japanese syllabary).

History
As long ago as the Meiji Restoration, there had been dissatisfaction regarding the growing discrepancy between spelling and speech. On November 16, 1946, soon after World War II, the cabinet instituted the modern Japanese orthography as part of a general orthographic reform. The system was further amended in 1986.

General differences
There were no small kana in the pre-reform system; thus, for example,  would be ambiguous between kiyo and kyo while  could be either katsuta or katta.

The pronunciation of medial h-row kana as w-row kana in the pre-reform system does not extend to compound words; thus,  was pronounced nihon, not nion (via **niwon). The h-row was historically pronounced as fa, fi, fu, fe, fo (and even further back, pa, pi, pu, pe, po). Japanese f is close to a voiceless w, and so was easily changed to w in the middle of a word; the w was then dropped except for  wa. This is also why fu is used to this day and has not become hu.

The vowel + (f)u changes do not apply between elements of compound words, for example, the name  was Terauchi not Terōchi, as it is Tera (temple) + uchi (inside, home). The -fu of the modern -u series of verbs  (that is, those verbs using the actual kana う, such as kau or omou) was not affected by the sound changes on the surface; however, some reports of Edo era Japanese indicate that verbs like tamau and harau were pronounced as tamō and harō instead. In contrast, the -ō in darō and ikō is a product of the sound change from au to ō.

Furthermore, the topic particle wa , the direction particle e  and the direct object particle o  were exempted from spelling reform. In contemporary Japanese, the を-character is used only for the particle.

Examples

Regarding  – these four morae are distinguished or merged to varying degrees in different Japanese dialects, with some dialects (Tōhoku and Okinawan, for example) merging all four into one, while other dialects (Tosa and Satsugū, for example) distinguish among the four. Standard spelling reflects the pronunciation of standard Japanese, which merges these into two sounds.

See also
 Yotsugana

Kana
Japanese orthography
Spelling reform